Kolejny krok was the first album of Paprika Korps. "Kolejny krok" means "the next step", because the album probably the biggest step of small band from small town from Poland called Paprika Korps. After releasing "Kolejny Krok" on MC in 1999, they gathered dozens of positive reviews and were being invited to play more and more gigs in Poland and then in whole Europe. They started to feel on tour like at home and by playing in 24 countries became one of the most touring polish alternative band. Even though their music evolved quite far away from the songs recorded on "Kolejny Krok" this album will surely have important place in the history of Paprika. Songs like "Rewolucja" or "From soul to soul" survived and still are permanent in Paprika setlists.
In 2005, the album was remastered and published on CD.

Track listing

 "Tam-tam Intro" - 2:23
 "Let Me Know" - 3:26
 "Triolki" - 2:58
 "From Soul To Soul" - 5:21
 "Instrumental" - 2:56
 "Rewolucja" - 4:18
 "Poprzez Babilonu Mur" - 2:29
 "Za Nami" - 4:18
 "Strange Dub" - 5:59

Paprika Korps albums
1999 albums